Tito Time is the first solo studio album by American singer Tito Jackson. It was released on December 21, 2016, by Play It Right Music, LLC..

Background
The album is the first solo album by Tito Jackson after decades being a founding member of The Jackson 5.

Track listing

Personnel
Credits adapted from AllMusic.

Tito Jackson - Primary Artist, composer, songwriter

Release history

References

2016 albums